Kamlar or Kam Lar or Kamalar or Kemlar or Komlar may refer to:
 Kamlar, Golestan
 Kam Lar, Zanjan